Sim Var (2 February 190612 October 1989) was a Cambodian politician. He served as Prime Minister of Cambodia from July 1957 to January 1958 and from April to July 1958. Together with Chhean Vam and Ieu Koeus, he co-founded the Democratic Party in April 1946. As a nationalist, Var opposed the French rule over Cambodia and led opposition movements with other nationalists. He was Cambodia's Ambassador to Japan during the 1970s.

Background
Sim Var was born in 1906 in the Kompong Cham district of Tbuong Khmom (now a province) to a family of farmers. He was one of the first Cambodian nationalists. He co-founded the Democratic Party in 1946 alongside fellow nationalists Chhean Vam and Ieu Keous, with the purpose of leading a democratic movement against the French protectorate. He also co-founded the first newspaper in Cambodia in 1939 along with Pach Chheun and Son Ngoc Thanh, known as "Nokor Wat".

In February 1947, Var was under arrest along with 16 other Democrats by French authorities over accusations of being a member of a pro-Japanese group that opposes the French rule of Cambodia. He was sent to Prey Nokor for nine months from March to November 1947 and finally to Kompong Cham until his release in 1948. He became Prime Minister in 1957 and served just under one year until 1958 due to economic issues.

In 1962, he married Ma Prakob and gave birth to a son and a daughter. The couple formally divorced years later. He later served as Cambodia's envoy to Japan in the Lon Nol government and married a Japanese woman there, named Yoko Kawada. Var was believed to be involved in the coup that overthrew Norodom Sihanouk. He took refuge in Paris during the Khmer Rouge rule of Cambodia until his death on 12 October 1989 at the age of 83.

References

|-

|-

 

1906 births
1989 deaths
20th-century Cambodian politicians 
Prime Ministers of Cambodia
Government ministers of Cambodia
Democratic Party (Cambodia) politicians
Ambassadors of Cambodia to Japan
People from Kampong Cham province
Cambodian expatriates in France 
Cambodian nationalists
Cambodian diplomats
Cambodian independence activists
Defence ministers of Cambodia 
Foreign ministers of Cambodia
Sangkum politicians